Philips Innovator (also Equity & Law II) is a 63 foot aluminium racing yacht designed by Rolf Vrolijk and built by Aluboot. She finished second in the 1985–86 Whitbread Round the World Race skippered by Dirk Nauta. After an extensive refit she participated in the 1989-90 Whitbread Round the World Race as Equity and Law II again skippered by Dirk Nauta.

References

Volvo Ocean Race yachts
Sailing yachts of the Netherlands
Equity and Law II in de Whitbread Round the World Race 1989 - 1990
Author: Christiaan Brakman
ISBN: 90-6291-579-5